East Aurora Public School District 131 (also known as Aurora Public Schools: East Side) is a public school district serving preschool through high school students in Aurora, Illinois, United States. It is considered the state's first public school district.

According to the 2016 Illinois State Report Card, the district had a total enrollment of 14,659 students. There are 12 elementary schools, three middle schools, one magnet academy (grades three through eight), two early childhood centers and East Aurora High School, all within Aurora city limits. The superintendent of East Aurora School District 131 is Dr. Jennifer Norrell. The school board president is Annette Johnson.

The district is bounded by the county line between DuPage County and Kane County to the east, the county line between Kendall County and Kane County to the south, the Fox River to the west, and the border with the neighboring West Aurora and Batavia School Districts to the north.

History

According to "The Educational History of Illinois", private subscription schools were taught by various teachers on the East Side starting in 1834. The first school in what would later become East Aurora School District 131 opened in 1836 at East Galena and Broadway. The school was subscription based. In 1839, a new school was built near Broadway and Claim Street.

East Aurora became a charter district on April 30, 1847, and was officially recognized by the state in 1851. The district became the first free school system in Illinois under a special act of legislature in 1851, two years before the state's free school laws passed. That same year, a two-story school was built with Merwin Tabor as principal. The first grade schools were built four years later.

The first class from East Aurora High School graduated in 1867. In 1878, East Aurora High School formed the first high school orchestra in the country. The first kindergarten opened in 1890 and, in 1903, the district started a school for deaf children.

There are several East Aurora School District 131 schools that no longer exist, including: New York Street School (1851-1864), Center School (1866-1957), First Indian Creek School (1870-1899), Indian Creek School (1899-1957), D.W. Young School (1875-1956), First Oak Park School (1887-1923) and Marion Avenue School (1889-1929).

District information
According to the 2016 Illinois state report cards, there were 14,659 students enrolled in East Aurora School District 131. Of those students, 86.6 percent were Hispanic, 7.7 percent were black, 3.2 percent were white, .6 percent were Asian, .4 percent were American Indian and 1.4 percent were categorized as one or more races.

According to the 2016 Illinois state report cards, 62.7 percent of East Aurora School District 131 students were considered low income and 34.3 percent had limited English proficiency. One-third receive bilingual services.

The student-to-staff ratio at the elementary school level was 19 to 1 and at the high school it was 22 to 1, according to the 2016 report cards. The average East Aurora School District 131 teacher had more than 11 years' experience. More than 55 percent of teachers had a master's degree or higher.

Elementary schools

Middle schools

High schools

Magnet academy

Early childhood centers

Special education

References

External links
Official site

Education in Aurora, Illinois
School districts in Kane County, Illinois
1847 establishments in Illinois
School districts established in 1847